Zama Adelaide Khumalo (born 25 August 2002) is a South African singer. She is best known for winning the sixteenth season of South African Idols in 2020. Born in Witbank, Zama signed a record deal with Kalawa Jazmee, released debut studio album In The Beginning (2021).

Career 
Shortly after she won the competition, Zama began to work on her debut studio album In The Beginning later released in November 2021. In October 29, her single  "Is'thunzi" was released as album's lead single.

References

Idols South Africa winners
Living people
21st-century South African women singers
2002 births